Hydrobioides is a genus of a freshwater snails with an operculum, aquatic prosobranch gastropod mollusks in the family Bithyniidae.

Distribution of this genus include Laos, Myanmar and Thailand.

Species
Hydrobioides nana Annandale, 1918
Hydrobioides nassa  (Theobald, 1865)
Hydrobioides turrita Blanford, 1869 - type species

References

Bithyniidae